Ehsan Rouzbahani (born June 23, 1988) is an Iranian professional  boxer who competed at the 2012 and 2016 Olympics at light heavyweight.

At the 2010 Asian Games he lost his second bout to Elshod Rasulov. At the 2011 World Amateur Boxing Championships he beat three fighters including Joe Ward then lost again to veteran Elshod Rasulov (UZB). He qualified for the 2012 Olympics.

At the 2012 Olympics he defeated Jeysson Monroy (COL) in his first bout. In the round of 16, he defeated number 6th seed, Bayram Muzaffer (TUR). The Iranian edged past the first round 5–4 and the Turkish boxer clinched the second round with a similar result. In the final round, Rouzbahani gained the upper hand and upped his work rate and Muzaffer could not cope with the sudden injection of pace. Rouzbahani lost in the quarterfinals to Adilbek Niyazymbetov of Kazakhstan, with a final score of 10–13. 

In 2013 Rouzbahani competed in World Series of Boxing.

References

1988 births
Living people
Sportspeople from Tehran
Light-heavyweight boxers
Boxers at the 2012 Summer Olympics
Boxers at the 2016 Summer Olympics
Olympic boxers of Iran
Asian Games bronze medalists for Iran
Asian Games medalists in boxing
Boxers at the 2010 Asian Games
Boxers at the 2014 Asian Games
Iranian male boxers

Medalists at the 2014 Asian Games
21st-century Iranian people